Kato, also spelled as Kaato or Katto, is one of the traditional musical instruments of Punjab. It is used in various cultural activities specially in folk dances like Bhangra, Malwai Giddha. Kato literally means squirrel in Punjabi and named after its design similar to squirrel but used as a symbol of happiness. In Punjab, when a happy man is asked how he is? He answered, "Ajj Taan Kaato Phullan Te Aa", roughly translated to be the squirrel of his mood on flowers.

Design and playing

It is made of wood. A wooden shape of a squirrel is attached to one end of a stick the player holds the other end of the stick and pulled the ropes tied to the squirrel's mouth and tail and so the wooden squirrel functions and makes low clap sound.

See also

Dhadd
Folk Instruments of Punjab

References

Punjabi culture
Punjabi music
Folk instruments of Punjab